The Conlay MRT station, or Conlay–Kompleks Kraf station due to sponsorship reasons, is a mass rapid transit (MRT) station in Bukit Bintang subdistrict in central Kuala Lumpur, Malaysia. It is one of the stations under the Putrajaya Line.

The station had commenced operations on 16 March 2023.

Station details

Location 
The station is located at Jalan Stonor, and is near its namesake Jalan Conlay.

Nearby landmarks include Royale Chulan Hotel, Kompleks Kraf and Rumah Penghulu Abu Seman.

Pavilion Kuala Lumpur is a 750 metres walk away, allowing access to Bukit Bintang MRT/Monorail.

Exits and entrances 
There are a total of 2 entrances for this station. Both of the entrances are located at opposite sides of each other, Entrance A at north and Entrance B at south.

References

External links
 Conlay MRT Station | mrt.com.my
 Klang Valley Mass Rapid Transit
 MRT Hawk-Eye View

Rapid transit stations in Kuala Lumpur
Sungai Buloh-Serdang-Putrajaya Line